Pablo Santos (9 January 1987 – 15 September 2006) was a Mexican actor.

Career 
Santos was born in Monterrey, Nuevo León. At the age of 12 he moved with his family to Los Angeles, California. He began an acting career and starred as the son of a Mexican-Irish-American family portrayed in Greetings from Tucson, which ran on the WB network from 2002 to 2003.

After the series ended, he appeared in the 2004 film Party Animalz. He also appeared in television shows such as Law & Order: Special Victims Unit and Boston Public.

Death 
Santos died on 15 September 2006 in a plane crash at Toluca International Airport in Toluca, west of Mexico City. He was piloting a private light plane, a Piper PA-46 Malibu Mirage, from Monterrey to Acapulco with six friends as passengers to celebrate Mexican Independence Day when the plane crashed over a mile (1.6 km) short of the runway while he was attempting an emergency landing due to low fuel levels. Another passenger, Martel Fernández, died the following day, while the others on board were hospitalized for minor injuries.

Filmography 
 2006: Gettin' Some Jail Time
 2006: Walkout
 2005: Sea of Dreams
 2005: Shackles
 2004: Party Animalz
 2003: Boston Public: Episode 1 "Chapter Sixty Seven" (TV series)
 2003: The Proud Family (TV series)
 2002: Law & Order: Special Victims Unit: Episode "Angels" (TV series)
 2002: Greetings from Tucson (TV series)
 2002: Cojones
 2002: Jeremiah: Episode "Red Kiss" (TV series)
 2002: American Family : Episode "Crash Boom Love" Parts 1 & 2 (TV series)
 2002: The Shield: Episode "Journey of Dreams" (TV series) 2001: Alias: Episode "Doppelgänger" (TV series)
 2000: The Weeping Woman of the River 2000: Resurrection Boulevard: Episode "Comenzando de Nuevo"'' (TV series)

References

External links 

Fox News obituary

1987 births
2006 deaths
Aviators killed in aviation accidents or incidents
Male actors from Monterrey
Mexican male child actors
Mexican male film actors
Mexican male television actors
Mexican Scientologists
Victims of aviation accidents or incidents in Mexico
Victims of aviation accidents or incidents in 2006